Raphiscopa is a genus of moths of the family Erebidae. The genus was erected by George Hampson in 1925.

Species
Raphiscopa albipunctata Holloway, 2008 Borneo
Raphiscopa albireniformis Holloway, 2008 Borneo
Raphiscopa egnasidoides Holloway, 2008 Borneo
Raphiscopa hirsuta Holloway, 2008 Borneo, Sumatra, Peninsular Malaysia
Raphiscopa mulundulata Holloway, 2008 Borneo
Raphiscopa medialis Holloway, 2008 Borneo
Raphiscopa rudmuna (C. Swinhoe, 1905) Borneo
Raphiscopa serrata Prout, 1928 Borneo
Raphiscopa undulata (Felder & Rogenhofer, 1874) Java, Peninsular Malaysia, Sumatra, Borneo
Raphiscopa viridialis Holloway, 2008 Borneo

References

Herminiinae